The Waverly Gallery is a play by Kenneth Lonergan. It is considered a "memory play". The show, first produced Off-Broadway in 2000, follows a grandson watching his grandmother slowly die from Alzheimer's disease. The play was a finalist for the Pulitzer Prize for Drama in 2001.

Productions
The play opened Off-Broadway at the Promenade Theater on March 22, 2000 and closed on May 21, 2000. Directed by Scott Ellis, the play starred Eileen Heckart as Gladys Green and Josh Hamilton as Daniel. The play originally premiered at the Williamstown Theatre Festival, running from August 11, 1999 to August 22, 1999. Joanne Woodward filled in for an ailing Eileen Heckart in the final four performances.

The play premiered on Broadway at the John Golden Theatre on September 25, 2018 in previews, officially on October 25. The cast included:
Elaine May as Gladys
Lucas Hedges as Daniel 
Joan Allen as Ellen
Michael Cera as Don
David Cromer as Howard

The revival was directed by Lila Neugebauer. The play closed on January 27, 2019 after 109 performances.

Plot
Gladys Green owns a small art gallery in Greenwich Village. She is in her 80s and showing signs of Alzheimer's disease. Don, a young artist, arrives for a showing of his work. The landlord wants to close the art gallery and replace it with a restaurant. How her family – daughter Ellen, son-in-law Howard and grandson Daniel – deals with her decline is told by the grandson.

(The minor character of the landlord, onstage at the Williamstown production, was dropped for the Off-Broadway 2000 production. He was included in a later production at the Pasadena Playhouse in 2002.)

Critical reception
Charles Isherwood in Variety said, "The life trauma being depicted has an inherent pathos, and in Lonergan's hands, no small amount of comic potential. And yet, while Lonergan mines his subject with delicacy and wit, he runs out of dramatic ore well before the evening's end."

Ben Brantley in The New York Times called the play a "finely observed story of the predations of old age...[it] isn't so much a proper play as an essayistic memoir given dramatic form. It is nonetheless deeply theatrical. Mr. Lonergan ... has one of the keenest ears of any working playwright.... is also often deeply funny."

Awards and nominations

2000 Off-Broadway
The Waverly Gallery was a finalist for the Pulitzer Prize for Drama in 2001. 

Awards and Nominations: 
The 2000 Drama Desk Awards - Outstanding Actress (Heckart) - Winner
The 1999–2000 Obie Award - Performance (Heckart) - Winner
The 2000 Lucille Lortel Award - Outstanding Actress (Heckart) - Winner
The 2000 Drama League Award - Distinguished Performance (Heckart) - Winner
The 2000 Outer Critics Circle Award, John Glassner Award (Lonergan) - Nominated

2018 Broadway revival

2019 Drama Desk Awards
Outstanding Revival of a Play - Winner
Outstanding Actress in a Play (Elaine May) - Winner

2019 Tony Awards
Tony Award for Best Revival of a Play - Nominated
Tony Award for Best Actress in a Play (Elaine May) - Winner

On June 9, 2019, May won the Tony Award for Best Actress in a Play for her performance as Gladys in the Broadway revival of Kenneth Lonergan's The Waverly Gallery. She also received a Drama League Award nomination and won a Drama Desk Award and an Outer Critics Circle Award for Outstanding Actress in a Play.[66] That same year, May's film A New Leaf was selected by the Library of Congress for preservation in the National Film Registry for being "culturally, historically, or aesthetically significant".[67]

References

External links
Internet Broadway Database

2000 plays
Plays by Kenneth Lonergan
Plays set in New York City